The Gamer's Handbook of the Marvel Universe is a series of role-playing game supplements published by TSR, beginning in 1988, for the Marvel Super Heroes role-playing game.

Contents
The Gamer's Handbook of the Marvel Universe is a series of perfect-bound books for the Marvel Super Heroes Advanced Set game, initially consisting of four handbooks. The heroes and villains are each described on a double-sided sheet, and full-color illustrations appear for each of the major characters. The sheets come drilled so that they can be placed in a three-ring or two-ring binder for the purpose of storage and removal of characters during gaming sessions.

The first four volumes of the Gamer's Handbook of the Marvel Universe are supplements for the Advanced rules of heroes and villains, each full described and color-illustrated on a separate hole-punched sheet, alphabetical. Volume one features Abomination thru Dreadnought, volume two features Eel thru Mad-Dog, volume three features Mad Thinker thru Sentry, and volume four features Serpent Society thru Zzzax. The next two volumes in the series were titled 1989 Character Updates and 1990 Character Updates.

Publication history
The first four volumes of the Gamer's Handbook of the Marvel Universe were designed by David A. Martin, Chris Mortika, and Scott Bennie, and were published by TSR, Inc., in 1988 as 256-page five-hold punched books. The fifth volume was designed by Scott Bennie, David Martin, Chris Mortika, David Rogers, and William Tracy, and was published in 1989, and the sixth volume was designed by David Martin, Chris Mortika, Scott E. Davis, William Tracy, and Raymond Maddox, and was published in 1990; both featured covers by Jeff Butler and were the same size as the first four volumes.

Bibliography

Reception
Jim Bambra reviewed volumes 1-3 of the Gamer's Handbook of the Marvel Universe for Dragon magazine #145 (May 1989). Rolston called the books "exquisitely produced" and commented that "these handbooks are a godsend. Anyone who plays the Marvel Super Heroes Advanced Set game can't afford to be without these, as they form the ultimate in sourcebooks. 'Nuff said!"

References

Marvel Comics encyclopedias
Marvel Comics role-playing game supplements
Role-playing game supplements introduced in 1988